The 2021 Hazfi Cup was the 34th season of the Iranian football knockout competition. Foolad won the competition after deafiting Esteghlal in the final.

Participating teams
A total of 96 teams are eligible participate in the 2021 Hazfi Cup. The teams were divided into four main groups.

16 teams of the Persian Gulf Pro League: (entering from Round of 32)

 All of the 16 teams were obliged to participate.

18 teams of Azadegan League:  (entering from Third Round)

 13 teams (from maximum 18 possible) were registered to participate.

28 teams of 2nd Division:  (entering from Second Round)

 17 teams (from maximum 28 possible) were registered to participate.

34 teams of Provincial Leagues: (Kish, Khoramshahr and Tehran can have extra Representatives.) (entering from First Round)

 25 teams (from maximum 34 possible) were registered to participate.

Schedule
The schedule of the competition is as follows.

First stage

Preliminary round

Fixture source:
Results source:

First round
Fixture source:
Results source:

Second round

Fixture source:

Results source:
This round includes 11 winners of First Round and 17 teams (which registered to participate) from 2nd Division.

Third round

This round includes 14 winners of First Round and 18 teams from the Azadegan League. 
Shahrdari Bardeskan (4), Khooshe Talaei Saveh (2), Vista Toorbin (3), Havadar Pakdasht (2), and Shahin Bandar Ameri (3) received byes to the next round.

Second stage

Fourth round (round of 32) 
The 16 teams from Iran Pro League entered the competition from the second stage.

Fifth Round (round of 16)

Sixth Round (quarter-finals)

Seventh Round (semi-finals)

Eighth Round (final)

Bracket

Statistics

See also 
 Iran Pro League 2020–21
 Azadegan League 2020–21
 Iran Football's 2nd Division 2020-21
 Iran Football's 3rd Division 2020–21
 Iranian Super Cup

Notes

References

Hazfi Cup seasons
Hazfi Cup
Hazfi Cup
2020–21 Hazfi Cup